Nicolas Chambon (21 September 1748, Limeil-Brévannes, (Val-de-Marne), France -  2 November 1826, Paris, France) was a French politician who served as Mayor of Paris from 1792 to 1793.

1748 births
1826 deaths
Mayors of Paris